The Fauvel AV.17 (AV for aile volante was a flying wing glider built in France in the late 1940s.

Specifications

References

Tailless aircraft
Flying wings
1940s French sailplanes
Fauvel aircraft
Glider aircraft
Aircraft first flown in 1946